Magdalene Toroansi is a diplomat and politician from the Autonomous Region of Bougainville, who was Minister for Women from 2005 and 2008. In 2010 and in 2020 she ran as a candidate for President of the Autonomous Region of Bougainville, but was unsuccessful on both occasions.

Career 
Toroansi is from Central Bougainville. She studied at the University of Papua New Guinea and then worked in the Papua New Guinea Department of Foreign Affairs for twenty years. During her time there she was posted overseas - to the Republic of Korea, as well as to the USA.

Toroansi was elected to the House of Representatives in 2005 to represent the Women's (South) constituency. She defeated the incumbent woman MP Theresa Jaintong. She was sacked from her position as Women's Minister in the cabinet of President Joseph Kabui on 3 June 2008. She lost her role as she was the only member of the cabinet to oppose Kabui's contract with a Canadian mining company to extract minerals from Panguna mine and take 70% of profits out of the country. During Kabui's presidency she also held the roles of Minister for Education and as Minister for Local Government. In 2009 she held the role of Chair of the Public Accounts Committee of Bougainville. Her appointment to these positions, according to Cate Morris, demonstrates that "female politicians from Bougainville" are able to hold "the highest positions held by women in politics throughout the Pacific, including that of Australia and New Zealand".

In 2010 Toroansi was the only woman candidate to contest the Autonomous Bougainville Government (ABG) presidential election. She stood against the then president James Tanis, as well as John Momis, Reuben Siara, Robert Atsir, Martin Miriori and Sylvester Niu.

In 2020 Toroansi was one of two women to enter as a candidate in the presidential election; the other was Ruby Mirinka. Neither were elected.

References 

Living people
Year of birth missing (living people)
Bougainvillean politicians
Bougainvillean women in politics
Papua New Guinean diplomats
University of Papua New Guinea alumni
Papua New Guinean women diplomats